Cast Glance is a gyrostabilized optical instrument used by the United States Navy and United States Air Force. It is an airborne system that is used by Air Test and Evaluation Squadron 30 (VX-30) on board the Lockheed NP-3D Orion. The system consists of a moving gyro-stabilised mirror with fixed optics, two fixed cameras and five sensors. The cameras look out of the starboard side of the aircraft. The system is photometric and enables the simultaneous recording of the electro-optical to the infrared spectrum and medium wave IR.

The system provides photographic coverage of air-to-air, air-to-surface or surface-to-air test operations. Cast Glance was also used to support the Space Shuttle program.

External links
Cast Glance Near Infrared Imaging - Futron Corporation
Video imagery produced by Cast Glance (from 02:57)

References

Military electronics of the United States
Optical instruments